"A New Leaf" is a short story by F. Scott Fitzgerald that published in July 1931 in The Saturday Evening Post.

Synopsis
The story of four young Americans in Paris. Includes the betrayal of "true love."

References

Short stories by F. Scott Fitzgerald
1931 short stories
Works originally published in The Saturday Evening Post